Shuttleworth College may refer to:

Shuttleworth College (Bedfordshire), a further education college in Old Warden, Bedfordshire
Shuttleworth College, Padiham, a comprehensive school in Burnley, Lancashire